STU may refer to:

Universities
 Seoul Theological University, South Korea
 Shantou University, Shantou, Guangdong, China
 Shu-Te University, Yanchao District, Kaohsiung, Taiwan
 Slovak University of Technology in Bratislava (Slovak: Slovenská technická univerzita), Slovakia
 St. Thomas University (Florida), United States
 St. Thomas University (New Brunswick), Fredericton, New Brunswick, Canada

Other uses
 STU-I, a model of secure telephone
 Special Tactical Unit, a counter terrorist unit in Odisha, India
 Theater Scena STU, in Kraków, Poland

See also
 Stu or Stuart, a masculine given name